The Dart Valley Railway could refer to one of two heritage railways in Devon:

 The South Devon Railway (heritage railway), which was reopened by Dart Valley Light Railway plc in 1969, and taken over by South Devon Railway Trust in 1992.
 The Dartmouth Steam Railway, which Dart Valley Light Railway plc took over in 1972, and which the company (now called simply Dart Valley Railway plc) still runs.